Alia Martine Shawkat (born April 18, 1989) is an American actress. She is known for her roles in The Old Man, State of Grace, Maeby Fünke in the Fox/Netflix television sitcom Arrested Development (2003–2006; 2013–2019),  Dory Sief in the TBS and HBO Max comedy series Search Party (2016–2022) and Gertie Michaels in the 2015 horror-comedy film The Final Girls. She has also guest starred as Frances Cleveland, Virginia Hall, and Alexander Hamilton on Comedy Central's Drunk History.

Early life
Shawkat was born in Riverside, California, to Dina Shawkat (née Burke) and film producer Tony Shawkat. She grew up in Palm Springs. She has two brothers. Her father is from Baghdad, Iraq, and her mother is of Norwegian, Irish, and Italian descent. Her maternal grandfather was actor Paul Burke.

Career
From 2001 to 2004, Shawkat played Hannah in State of Grace. As Maeby Fünke, Shawkat was a regular cast member of Arrested Development for the entire run of the show from 2003 to 2019. The series received nearly universally positive reviews, with Shawkat's performance occasionally singled out for praise. Pop-culture commentator Brian M. Palmer remarked that she was "one of the brightest lights on a show populated solely by bright lights", and Scott Weinberg of eFilmCritic described her as "one funny young lady." In an interview with The A.V. Club in 2010, Shawkat remarked that many of her "formative moments" as an actress took place on the Arrested Development set: " [Show creator] Mitch Hurwitz was like a father figure to me. In a way, it was great to be around [the cast], because I feel that my understanding of comedy was able to grow really well during that time."

In 2009, Shawkat appeared in Whip It co-star Har Mar Superstar's music video for "Tall Boy", which also featured Eva Mendes and Eric Wareheim. In October 2009, it was announced that Shawkat, Har Mar, and Whip It co-star Elliot Page would produce and write a show for HBO called Stitch N' Bitch. According to The Hollywood Reporter, the show "follows two painfully cool hipsters as they relocate from Brooklyn's Williamsburg neighborhood to Los Angeles' Silver Lake enclave in hopes of becoming artists—of any kind."

Shawkat, along with Arrested Development co-star and close friend Mae Whitman, sang guest vocals on a number of tracks from indie-punk band Fake Problems' 2010 album Real Ghosts Caught on Tape.

Six years after the series was canceled by Fox, filming for a revived fourth season of Arrested Development began on August 7, 2012 and Shawkat reprised her role as Maeby Fünke. The season consists of 15 new episodes which debuted at the same time on Netflix on May 26, 2013. Each episode focuses on one particular character, with Shawkat's Maeby, now a high school senior, featured in episode 12, "Señoritis" and appearing in several other episodes of the season.

Shawkat appears briefly in Ryan Trecartin's 2013 art film, Center Jenny.

In 2015, Shawkat guest-starred on Broad City, portraying the romantic interest and look-alike of Ilana Glazer's character for one episode; the two were only attracted to one another due to their similar appearances. Leading up to the episode, many had remarked on the physical similarities Shawkat and Glazer bear to one another.

Shawkat starred in the lead role of Dory Sief on the TBS comedy Search Party, which premiered on November 21, 2016 and moved to HBO Max in 2019 before concluding with its fifth and final season in January 2022.

Shawkat plays the role of Tyler, a high-living American partier in Dublin, in the 2019 film Animals, directed by Australian director Sophie Hyde. It is a film about a friendship which changes after Laura (played by Holliday Grainger) gets engaged to her teetotalling boyfriend. Shawkat said that she had never played a character like Tyler before, with her previous characters more relatable, and she was "excited to play someone who was so fun, but so damaged".

Personal life
When not acting, Shawkat likes to paint; she has participated in gallery shows in Los Angeles, Mexico City and Paris. She also likes to make music and sing in jazz bars. She is bisexual.

Filmography

Film

Television

Podcasts

Music videos

Awards and nominations

References

External links
 
 

21st-century American actresses
Actresses from Palm Springs, California
Actresses from Riverside, California
American child actresses
American film actresses
American people of Arab descent
American people of Iraqi descent
American people of Irish descent
American writers of Italian descent
American people of Norwegian descent
American television actresses
Bisexual actresses
LGBT people from California
American LGBT people of Asian descent
Living people
21st-century American women writers
Screenwriters from California
21st-century American screenwriters
21st-century American LGBT people
American bisexual actors
1989 births